Christopher Mannella (born June 7, 1994) is a Canadian professional soccer player who plays as a midfielder.

Club career

Toronto FC
Mannella joined the youth academy of Toronto FC in 2009 to play in the Canadian Soccer League. In 2014, he was a part of the inaugural season of League1 Ontario with Toronto's senior Academy team. He was named the team's captain and made 11 appearances for the side as they captured the regular season championship.

On September 14, 2014, Mannella signed a homegrown player contract with Toronto FC, making him the 10th homegrown signing in club history.

Mannella was loaned to Toronto FC II on March 20, 2015 ahead of their inaugural season in the USL. He was named captain of the team upon his arrival. Mannella made his debut against the Charleston Battery on March 21. After two years with Toronto FC II, the club announced they would not pick up Mannella's contract option for the 2017 season.

Vaughan Azzurri
In 2017, Mannella played for League1 Ontario side Vaughan Azzurri, scoring two goals in fifteen appearances. He was subsequently named to the league Second All-Star team at the end of the season.

Ottawa Fury
On March 16, 2018, Mannella signed with the Ottawa Fury after trialing in pre-season. That year, he made 29 league appearances and another four in the Canadian Championship. In November 2018, The Fury announced Mannella would return for a second season in 2019.

In the 2019 season, Mannella made 30 league appearances and four in the Canadian Championship. He also started in Ottawa's playoff loss on penalties to Charleston Battery. The club ceased operations ahead of the 2020 season, making Mannella a free agent.

York United 
On December 17, 2019, Mannella signed with Canadian Premier League side York9, which later was renamed York United beginning the 2021 season.

Atlético Ottawa 
On April 6, 2021, Mannella signed with Canadian Premier League side Atlético Ottawa on a two-year deal.

International career
On January 9, 2015, Mannella received his first call-up to the Canadian men's national team for friendlies against Iceland on January 16 and 19.  He made his international debut a week later.

In May 2016, Mannella was called to Canada's U23 national team for a pair of friendlies against Guyana and Grenada. He saw action in both matches.

Career statistics

Club

International

Honours
Individual
League1 Ontario Second Team All Star: 2017

Team

Atlético Ottawa
 Canadian Premier League
Regular Season: 2022

References

External links

 
 
 

1994 births
Living people
Association football midfielders
Canadian soccer players
Soccer players from Toronto
Toronto FC players
Toronto FC II players
Ottawa Fury FC players
York United FC players
Atlético Ottawa players
Canadian Soccer League (1998–present) players
League1 Ontario players
USL Championship players
Canadian Premier League players
Canada men's under-23 international soccer players
Footballers at the 2015 Pan American Games
Canada men's international soccer players
Homegrown Players (MLS)
Pan American Games competitors for Canada
Vaughan Azzurri players
Canadian people of Italian descent